Todtenweis is a municipality in the district of Aichach-Friedberg in Bavaria in Germany.

Todtenweis is just east of the lake Aindlinger Baggersee.

References

Aichach-Friedberg